Prototocyon or Sivacyon is an extinct genus of small omnivorous canid living during the Late Pliocene and Early Pleistocene.

Taxonomy
Prototocyon was named by Pohle (1928) and was assigned to Canidae by Carroll (1988). Old literature relates it to Vulpes bengalensis, but not more modern literature (e.g. McKenna and Bell.)  Tedford et al. 2009 suggest that Prototocyon and Otocyon form a clade.

Description
Prototocyon was a small canine similar to the bat-eared fox in overall morphology and likely in habits as well. It differed from the modern bat-eared fox mainly in its more primitive dentition.

Fossil distribution
Fossil remains of P. curvipalatus were recovered from the early Pleistocene Upper Siwaliks horizon of the Siwalik Hills, India (Colbert 1935; Pilgrim 1932).

Fossils of P recki have been found by the Olduvai gorge area in Tanzania.

References

Vulpini
Prehistoric canines
Pleistocene carnivorans
Pleistocene mammals of Asia
Pleistocene mammals of Africa
Fossil taxa described in 1928
Prehistoric carnivoran genera